Tintori is a surname. Notable people with the surname include:

Gerardo dei Tintori (1134–1207), Italian Roman Catholic saint
John Tintori, American film editor and director
Karen Tintori (born 1948), American author
Lilian Tintori (born 1978), Venezuelan athlete and human rights activist
Ray Tintori, American short film and music video director